The  VU Western Spurs are a Women's Australian rules football club who compete in the Northern Football League (Australia) and the AFL Masters Victoria competition .  Based in Footscray, they play home games at Henry Turner Oval. They were formerly known as the St Albans Spurs who competed in the Victorian Women's Football League and reserves competition.

History 
They were founded in 1993 by Debbie Lee who has become a significant figure in the progression and success of women's AFL.

In 2015 the club was rebranded and relocated to Footscray, obtaining a sponsorship from the Maribyrnong City Council and Victoria University and were renamed the VU Western Spurs. They have strong ties to the Western Bulldogs; from 2018 their VFL Women's side used their name and colours. Jordan Roughead, a former Western Bulldogs ruckman, was also an assistant coach of the club from the 2015 - 2018 season.

Colours 
The VU Western Spurs have one guernsey which is predominately sky blue with dark blue trimmings and features their symbolic WS in white. At home the Spurs wear dark blue shorts and dark blue socks. When playing away from home the Spurs don all-white shorts with a blue stripe running down each side and dark blue socks.

Club song 
When relocating to Footscray and rebranding as the VU Western Spurs the club began using a new song 'The Spurs of the Mighty West' which is to the tune of the AFL club Greater Western Sydney Giants song. The closing line of 'We're the Spurs of the mighty west', was a creative way to include the club's connection to the Western Bulldogs who sing 'We're the team of the mighty west'. 

Well there's a big big sound
from the west of the town.
It's the sound of the mighty Spurs.

You'll see our great endeavour,
true Spurs we stick together,
we will always love the Spurs.

We ride the biggest bumps
and the hardest hits.
We're stronger than the rest.

We're the VU Western Spurs,
we're the biggest and the best

And we will never surrender,
we'll fight until the end.
We're the Spurs of the mighty west.

And we will never surrender,
we'll fight until the end.
We're the Spurs of the mighty west.

Sponsors 
The club's major sponsors include Victoria University, Proud Poppy Clothing, Lani The Sparky and Wheeler Financial.

AFLW Representatives 
The VU Western Spurs have had 8 players drafted to the AFLW competition whilst registered as a Spurs player. 
In the 2016 AFLW Draft, Alyssa Mifsud, Shelley Scott, Ainslie Kemp and Sarah Lampard were all drafted to  Melbourne FC, Bree White was drafted by Collingwood FC and Ashleigh Guest was drafted to Greater Western Sydney Giants.

In the 2017 AFLW Rookie Draft, Naomi Ferres was chosen by the Western Bulldogs at pick number 3. Ferres went on to win the 2018 AFL Women's Grand Final and took a crucial mark in the defensive 50 on the siren to deny the Brisbane Lions a chance to tie the game.  

The 2018 AFLW Draft saw Jessie Davies also be drafted by the Western Bulldogs at pick 46.

During the 2019 AFLW Draft, Elisabeth Georgostathis was drafted by the Western Bulldogs at pick 9.

In the preseason of the 2020 AFLW season , Vivien Saad was signed by the North Melbourne Football Club.

The Sydney Swans AFLW side was introduced ahead of the 2022/2023 season and with this came new opportunities for footballers across the country. A premiership Spur, Aimee Whelan was one of the inaugural signings for the club after a breakthrough season in the VFLW

Club Honours and Achievements 
2004 - VWFL Seniors Premiers vs. Melbourne University

2009 - Best Conducted Club for the Western Region

2011 - VWFL Seniors Premiers vs. Darebin Falcons

2012 - Victoria University Sports Awards: Sporting Club of the Year

2012 - VWFL Reserves Premiers

2017 - Northern Football League (Australia) Division 2 Premiers vs West Preston Lakeside

2019 - Northern Football League (Australia) Division 1 Premiers vs Diamond Creek 

2019 - Northern Football League (Australia) Division 2 Premiers vs Heidelberg

Coaching staff
Football Department

References

Victorian Women's Football League clubs
1993 establishments in Australia
Australian rules football clubs established in 1993
Australian rules football clubs in Melbourne
Sport in the City of Maribyrnong